Hunald, also spelled Hunold, Hunoald, Hunuald or Chunoald (or Chunoaldus), is a masculine given name of Germanic origin. It may refer to:

Hunald I, duke of Aquitaine (735–45)
Hunald II, duke of Aquitaine (768–69)
Hunold of Cambrai, bishop (1040–50)
Hunald of Toul (fl. 11th century), poet who wrote Carmen de anulo et baculo
Hunald (fl. 11th century), Benedictine monk, sculptor, stonemason and architect from Dijon
Hunald of Béarn (fl. 1073–91), abbot of Moissac
Hunald (fl. 12th century), Premonstratensian canon from Bonne-Espérance Abbey
Raymond Hunaud (d. 1299), Dominican friar from Toulouse